Elaan is a 1994 Indian Hindi action film directed by Guddu Dhanoa. It stars Amrish Puri, Akshay Kumar and Madhoo in pivotal roles. Other cast includes Farida Jalal, Dalip Tahil and Mohnish Behl. it was declared a "Hit".

Plot
Salman Khan was the original choice to play Akshay Kumar role, Elaan is a declaration of war against the reign of terror unleashed by the gang lords. The story revolves around an upright and principled Police Officer, A.C.P. Ramakant Chaudhary, whose eldest son Vikas is killed in a pre-planned accident. But the A.C.P. is unable to nab the culprits for want of valid evidence. Consequently, the A.C.P., his wife Revati, and younger son Vishal are grief-stricken over the loss of young Vikas. While the atmosphere in the city is already vitiated by the atrocities of gang lords Baba Khan and Manna Shetty, who enjoy the support of some unscrupulous police personnel, the A.C.P. vows to make the ruthless gangsters bite the dust, without taking the law into his own hands. On the other hand, Vishal, an angry young man, cannot stand this injustice since the police had failed to arrest his brother's killers, and he silently resents his A.C.P father's inaction in dealing with the culprits. The ideologies of the father and son clash – which leads to a conflict between a dutiful father and a reckless son. The only one who understands the agony of Vishal is Mohini, the daughter of head constable Devkinandan Sharma. The day comes when Vishal confronts Baba Khan and Manna Shetty, which leads to tension and a gory situation for the A.C.P., as the gang lords threaten to eliminate the A.C.P. as well as his wife Revati and son Vishal.

Cast

Akshay Kumar as Vishal Chaudhary
Amrish Puri as A.C.P. Ramakant Chaudhary
Madhoo as Mohini Sharma
Farida Jalal as Revati Chaudhary
Dalip Tahil as Police Commissioner Desai
Deven Verma as Devkinandan Sharma
Mohnish Behl as Vijay Sharma
Mohan Joshi as Baba Khan
Rami Reddy as Mana Shetty
Sulabha Arya as Parvati Sharma
Achyut Potdar as Public Prosecutor
Lalit Tiwari as Doctor Deepak
Narendra Gupta	as a Conspirator to make Ramakant Chaudhary as a mental patient

Soundtrack

References

External links

1994 films
1990s Hindi-language films
Indian action films
Law enforcement in India
Indian police films
1994 action films
1990s police films
Hindi-language action films
Films directed by Guddu Dhanoa